Aspergillus varians is a species of fungus in the genus Aspergillus. It is from the Nidulantes section. The species was first described in 1899.

Growth and morphology

A. varians has been cultivated on both Czapek yeast extract agar (CYA) plates and Malt Extract Agar Oxoid® (MEAOX) plates. The growth morphology of the colonies can be seen in the pictures below.

References 

varians
Fungi described in 1899